Antonio Fabré y Almerás was an 18th-century Spanish monk, writer and numismatist. He was born in the province of Cádiz in 1728 and died in Rota, Cádiz, in 1806.

Spanish male writers
Spanish numismatists
1728 births
1806 deaths
Spanish Christian monks
18th-century Spanish writers
People from Cádiz
18th-century male writers